The Schock 22 is an American trailerable sailboat that was designed by Wendell H. Calkins as a cruiser and first built in 1960.

Production
The design was built by W. D. Schock Corp in the United States, starting in 1960, with 26 boats completed, before production ended.

Design
The Schock 22 is a recreational keelboat, built predominantly of fiberglass, with wood trim. It has a fractional sloop rig, a spooned and nearly-plumb stem, a vertical transom, a transom-hung rudder controlled by a tiller and a fixed stub keel with a retractable centerboard. It displaces  and carries  of ballast.

The boat is normally fitted with a small outboard motor for docking and maneuvering.

See also
List of sailing boat types

References

Keelboats
1980s sailboat type designs
Sailing yachts
Trailer sailers
Sailboat type designs by Wendell H. Calkins 
Sailboat types built by W. D. Schock Corp